Rupt-aux-Nonains is a commune in the Meuse department in Grand Est in north-eastern France. It lies on the Saulx, which is crossed here by the bridge, carrying the date 1557, that is the commune's most notable feature.

See also
Communes of the Meuse department

References

Ruptauxnonains